is a village located in Uda District, Nara Prefecture, Japan.

As of April 2017, the village has an estimated population of 1,528 and a density of 32 persons per km2. The total area is 47.84 km2.

Geography

The village of Soni is located in the northeastern portion of Nara Prefecture, in Uda District. 
It is situated in a cool climate, and most dwellings are located near the valley. Many mountains, including the Byōbu-iwa,
are close to the valley. Also, the Shōrenji River flows through the village.

Surrounding municipalities
 Nara Prefecture
 Uda
 Mitsue
 Higashiyoshino
 Mie Prefecture
 Nabari
 Tsu

Notable locations
 Soni Plateau
 Koochi Valley
 Soni Plateau Hot Springs
 Byōbu-iwa

References

External links

 Soni village Official Site 
 

Villages in Nara Prefecture